Otochares is a genus of moths belonging to the family Tineidae.

Species
Otochares gypsopa Meyrick, 1919
Otochares peronacma Meyrick, 1919

References

Tineidae
Tineidae genera
Taxa named by Edward Meyrick